Corymbia rhodops, commonly known as the red-throated bloodwood, is a species of tree that is endemic to Queensland. It has rough, tessellated bark on the trunk and larger branches, lance-shaped adult leaves, flower buds in groups of seven, creamy white flowers with a red centre, and urn-shaped to barrel-shaped fruit.

Description
It has red-brown to grey-brown tessellated bark on the trunk and larger branches. Flowering occurs from December to February and the flowers have creamy white stamens with a red centre.

Taxonomy and naming
The red-throated bloodwood was first formally described in 1987 by Denis John Carr and Stella Grace Maisie Carr who gave it the name Eucalyptus rhodops and published the description in their book Eucalyptus II - The rubber cuticle, and other studies of the Corymbosae. They collected the type specimens near Watsonville in 1975. In 1995, Ken Hill and Lawrie Johnson changed the name to Corymbia rhodops, publishing the change in the journal Telopea.

Distribution and habitat
This bloodwood is only known form a few small population on steep slopes on the western side of the Atherton Tableland and on the Windsor Tablelands.

Conservation status
Corymbia rhodops was listed as vulnerable under the Environment Protection and Biodiversity Conservation Act 1999 in 2008. The plant has a limited range but the main identified threat to the tree is the destruction of habitat due to mining activity. It is also listed as "vulnerable" under the Queensland Government Nature Conservation Act 1992.

See also
 List of Corymbia species

References

rhodops
Myrtales of Australia
Flora of Queensland
Plants described in 1987
Taxa named by Maisie Carr